This is a partial discography of Giuseppe Verdi's opera Il trovatore (The Troubadour) and Le trouvère (the revised version in French translation). At least 83 recordings exist of the opera as a whole, made between 1912 and 2011, although not all of them are absolutely complete. Of these, 45 are live audio recordings, 22 are studio audio recordings, and 16 are videos or movies. Il trovatore was first performed at the Teatro Apollo, Rome on 19 January 1853. Le trouvère was first presented on 12 January 1857.

Audio recordings

Video recordings

Audio: Le trouvère (1857 French version)

Video: Le trouvère (1857 French version)

References
Notes

Sources
Amazon discography (30 items), accessed 25 March 2009
Il trovatore on Disc

Opera discographies
Operas by Giuseppe Verdi